Phospholipase D1 (PLD1) is an enzyme that in humans is encoded by the PLD1 gene, though analogues are found in plants, fungi, prokaryotes, and even viruses.

History 
The possibility of PLD1 was first mentioned in 1947 by authors Hanahan and Chaikoff at Berkeley when describing a carrot enzyme that could "[split] choline from phospholipids." PLD was first derived in mammals in 1975 by Saito and Kanfer, who noted its activity in rats. PLD was first cloned from HeLa cell cDNA in 1995, while mammalian PLD1 was first cloned from a rat in 1997.

Function 

Phosphatidylcholine (PC)-specific phospholipases D (PLDs)  catalyze the hydrolysis of PC to produce phosphatidic acid (PA) and choline. A range of agonists acting through G protein-coupled receptors and receptor tyrosine kinases stimulate this hydrolysis. PC-specific PLD activity has been implicated in numerous cellular pathways, including membrane trafficking, signal transduction, platelet coagulation, mitosis, apoptosis, and the creation of cytoplasmic lipid droplets.

Membrane trafficking 
PLD1 has been shown to associate at the plasma membrane, late endosome, early endosome, and the Golgi apparatus. There is evidence that PA is able to assist in negative membrane curvature due to its head group being smaller than in many other lipids. One experiment with PLD1 knockout showed a significant reduction in the number of exocytotic fusion events, implying a strong role in exocytosis.

Signal transduction 
PLD1 may play a role in some cells in the endocytosis of signaling receptors or exocytosis of signaling molecules. For example, one experiment in B cells showed that limiting PLD1 led to significantly reduced endocytosis of the B cell receptor. Another experiment showed that knocking out PLD1 may hinder the ability of mice to secrete catecholamines, molecules that are essential for vesicular communication across the body.

Structure 
Mammalian PLD1 has several domains for activators, inhibitors, and catalysis, which it shares with PLD2. Domains for both activation and inhibition are referred to as the phox homology (PX) and pleckstrin homology (PH) domains. The catalytic domain consists of two HKD regions, so named for three of the amino acids that are key in catalysis. These domains are conserved across many organisms. There are two splice variants of the protein, PLD1a and PLD1b, but they do not seem to localize any differently.

Applications 
Alzheimer's Disease: PA, which is produced in part by PLD1, seems to be involved in the movement of β-amyloid, which could precede amyloidogenesis.

Cancer: certain rat tumors with dominant negative PLD do not appear to form new colonies or tumors.

Thrombosis: PLD knockout mice appear to have reduced occlusion, thus offsetting thrombosis.

Type II Diabetes: the protein PED/PEA15 is often elevated in type II diabetic patients, thus enhancing PLD1 activity, and in turn impairing insulin.

Interactions 

Phospholipase D1 has been shown to interact with:

 Alpha-synuclein, 
 Amphiphysin, 
 BIN1, 
 CDC42,
 PEA15, 
 Protein kinase N1 
 RALA,  and
 RHOA.

Inhibitors
 Calphostin-c, an inhibitor
VU-0359595: 1,700-fold selective versus phospholipase D2, IC50 = 3.7nM.

References

Further reading 

 
 
 
 
 
 
 
 
 
 
 
 
 
 
 
 
 
 

EC 3.1.4